Yiff is a slang term used in the furry fandom to refer to pornographic content. It is considered a tongue-in-cheek term in the furry fandom. The term is also used as a way to insult members of the furry fandom, such as in the phrase "yiff in hell".

Furry conventions have strict policies regulating where yiff artwork can be displayed or sold.

History 

The origin of the term is unclear. However, according to Zack Parsons, yiff has been in the fandom since the 1990s.  

It is also thought to originate from a role player named Foxen, who created Foxish, a constructed language invented for use during online furry roleplaying. It was originally intended as a general-purpose expression of excitement or happiness, but became conflated with the term yipp, which carried sexual implications. 

The CSI episode "Fur and Loathing", which aired on October 30, 2003, increased awareness of the term outside of the furry fandom. The word yiff would later become mainstream during the same decade from anti-furry hate on various sites like 4chan.

Usage outside the furry fandom 
The term is also used in the plushie fetish community.

See also 
 Cartoon pornography
 Clop
 Rule 34

References

External links 

Yiff at WikiFur

Furry fandom
Pornography terminology
Pornography by genre